Buglovce is a village and municipality in Levoča District in the Prešov Region of central-eastern Slovakia.

History
In historical records the village was first mentioned in 1335.

Geography
The municipality lies at an altitude of 460 metres and covers an area of  (2020-06-30/-07-01).

Population 
It has a population of 280 people (2020-12-31).

Genealogical resources

The records for genealogical research are available at the state archive "Statny Archiv in Levoca, Slovakia"

 Roman Catholic church records (births/marriages/deaths): 1653-1895 (parish B)

See also
 List of municipalities and towns in Slovakia

References

External links
https://web.archive.org/web/20071217080336/http://www.statistics.sk/mosmis/eng/run.html
Surnames of living people in Buglovce

Villages and municipalities in Levoča District
Spiš